Bəyimli may refer to:
 Bəyimli, Agsu, Azerbaijan
 Bəyimli, Zardab, Azerbaijan